004, 0O4, O04, OO4 may refer to:

 004, fictional British 00 Agent
 0O4, Corning Municipal Airport (California)
 O04, the Oversea-Chinese Banking Corporation
 Abdul Haq Wasiq, Guantanamo detainee 004
 Junkers Jumo 004 turbojet engine
 Lauda Air Flight 004, an international passenger flight operated by a Boeing 767-300ER that crashed on 26 May 1991
 Charmander, the 4th Pokémon (#004) from the first generation Kanto region Pokédex

See also

 A-004, the sixth and final test of the Apollo launch escape vehicle